Iván Trevejo (born 1 September 1971) is a Cuban-born French fencer, silver Olympic medallist in 1996 and team world champion in 1997 for Cuba. He earned a team bronze medal for France in 2013.

Biography
He won a silver medal in the individual épée event at the 1996 Summer Olympics and a bronze in the team event at the 2000 Summer Olympics for Cuba. He made world team champion at the 1997 World Fencing Championships in Cape Town and placed third in the team event of the 1999 World Fencing Championships in Seoul.

After the 2002 World Fencing Championships in Lisbon he decided not to go back to Cuba. He settled in Southern France and went on fencing on the national circuit. He married a French woman, had a daughter and eventually became a French citizen in 2010, which allowed him to be selected in the French fencing team. After ten years away from high-level competition, he reached the quarter-finals in the Legnano World Cup in January 2013 and won a bronze medal in the Challenge RFF (Paris World Cup) in May. He was a member of the French team that won the bronze medal in the World Championships in Budapest and finished the 2012–13 season at 10th place in FIE rankings. In the 2013–14 season he earned a bronze medal in the Legnano World Cup and in the Vancouver Grand Prix.

References

External links
 
 Statistics on nahouw.net

1971 births
Living people
Cuban male fencers
European Games medalists in fencing
European Games gold medalists for France
French male épée fencers
Fencers at the 1996 Summer Olympics
Fencers at the 1999 Pan American Games
Fencers at the 2000 Summer Olympics
Fencers at the 2015 European Games
Medalists at the 1996 Summer Olympics
Medalists at the 2000 Summer Olympics
Olympic fencers of Cuba
Olympic silver medalists for Cuba
Olympic bronze medalists for Cuba
Olympic medalists in fencing
Pan American Games medalists in fencing
Pan American Games gold medalists for Cuba
Pan American Games bronze medalists for Cuba
Sportspeople from Havana
Universiade medalists in fencing
Universiade silver medalists for Cuba
Medalists at the 1997 Summer Universiade
Medalists at the 1999 Pan American Games